Kaoutar Farkoussi (born 19 March 1996) is a Moroccan runner.

On the track, she won the silver medal in the 5000 metres at the 2017 Jeux de la Francophonie, finished sixth at the 2017 Islamic Solidarity Games, and won the gold medal at the 2018 Mediterranean Games.

Outside the track, she won a silver medal in mixed relay at the 2019 World Cross Country Championships.

Her personal best 5000 metres time is 15:48.73 minutes, achieved in July 2018 in Rabat.

References

External links

1996 births
Living people
Moroccan female long-distance runners
Moroccan female cross country runners
Athletes (track and field) at the 2018 Mediterranean Games
Mediterranean Games gold medalists for Morocco
Mediterranean Games medalists in athletics
Athletes (track and field) at the 2019 African Games
Mediterranean Games gold medalists in athletics
African Games competitors for Morocco
21st-century Moroccan women